Glauco Sansovini (20 May 1938 – 21 May 2019) was a Sammarinese politician and one of the Captains Regent of San Marino together with Marco Conti for the semester from 1 April 2010 to 1 October 2010.

References

1938 births
2019 deaths
People from Rocca San Casciano
Captains Regent of San Marino
Members of the Grand and General Council
Sammarinese National Alliance politicians